Yakov Davidovich Zevin (1888–1918) was a Communist activist and one of the Bolshevik Party leaders in Azerbaijan during the Russian Revolution. Zevin was born in Krasnapolle, a town in nowadays Mahilyow Voblast, Belarus. He became a member of Russian Social Democratic Labour Party in 1904 and he was arrested several times for conducting revolutionary activities. He was a delegate in the 6th (Prague) conference of the Russian Social Democratic Labour Party in 1912, where he represented the group of Mensheviks. After the conference he became close to the Bolshevik positions. In 1915 he was a member of the Baku committee of Bolsheviks. After the February Revolution of 1917 he worked in the Moscow council of working deputies. Zevin became one of the 26 Baku Commissars (he was the Commissar of Labor) of the Soviet Commune that was established in the city after the October Revolution. When the Commune was toppled by the Centro Caspian Dictatorship, a British-backed coalition of Dashnaks, SRs and Mensheviks, Zevin and his comrades were captured by British troops and executed by a firing squad between the stations of Pereval and Akhcha-Kuyma of Transcaucasian Railroad on July 31, 1918.

References

1888 births
1918 deaths
Azerbaijani Jews
People from Krasnapolle District
Belarusian Jews
Russian Social Democratic Labour Party members
Mensheviks
Old Bolsheviks
20th-century executions by the United Kingdom
Azerbaijani communists
Executed politicians
Jewish Russian politicians
Jewish socialists
People executed by the British military by firing squad
People of the Russian Civil War
Executed Belarusian people
Articles containing video clips

Executed communists